Asmundtorp is a locality situated in Landskrona Municipality, Skåne County, Sweden with 1,562 inhabitants in 2010. Asmundtorp Church has been described as one of the most accomplished examples of 19th-century church architecture in Skåne.

Sports
The following sports clubs are located in Asmundtorp:

 Asmundtorps IF

References 

Populated places in Landskrona Municipality
Populated places in Skåne County